Nann Nann (born January 5, 1974) is a painter and modern sculptor from Myanmar. 

She won many domestic and international art 
awards. Since 1978,  she has been awarded 30 different local arts awards, and over 45 from international organisations. She also won the Myanmar Times Contemporary Art Award in 2004.

Early life and education 
Nann Nann was born on January 5 , 1974 in Yangon. She is the daughter of the artist U Mya Aye and artist Daw Nwe Nwei. She graduated with a Diploma of Fine Art from State School of Fine Art, Yangon at 1993 and 
a Bachelor of Art Degree in Sculpture from the University of Culture, Yangon at 1998.

Awards
1978 – 1990   Over 45 awards from various international organizations and Over 30 awards from various Burmese government organizations

2004 Honourable Mention – Myanmar Contemporary Art Awards

References

Living people
1974 births
Burmese painters
Burmese performance artists